Sayf al-Din Suri (Persian: سیف الدین سوری) was the king of the Ghurid dynasty from 1146 to 1149. He was the son and successor of Izz al-Din Husayn.

Biography 

When Sayf al-Din Suri ascended the throne, he divided the Ghurid kingdom among his brothers; Fakhr al-Din Masud received land near the Hari River; Baha al-Din Sam I received Ghur; Shihab al-Din Muhammad Kharnak received Madin; Shuja al-Din Ali received Jarmas; Ala al-Din Husayn received Wajiristan; and Qutb al-Din Muhammad received Warshad Warsh, where he built the famous city of Firuzkuh. However, Sayf later quarreled with his brother Qutb, who took refuge in Ghazna, and was poisoned by the Ghaznavid sultan Bahram-Shah of Ghazna.

In order to avenge his brother, Sayf marched towards Ghazna in 1148, and scored a victory at the Battle of Ghazni while Bahram fled to Kurram. Building an army, Bahram marched back to Ghazna. Sayf fled, but the Ghaznavid army caught up with him and a battle ensued at Sang-i Surakh. Sayf and Majd ad-Din Musawi were captured and later crucified at Pul-i Yak Taq. After his death, he was succeeded by his brother Baha al-Din Sam I.

References

Sources

 

12th-century Iranian people
Ghurid dynasty
1149 deaths
Year of birth missing